Bleron Krasniqi (born 18 September 2002) is a Kosovan footballer who plays as a forward for Berliner AK, on loan from Schalke 04 II.

Club career

Schalke 04
On 6 December 2020, Krasniqi made his debut with Schalke 04 II in a 0–1 away win against Fortuna Düsseldorf II after coming on as a substitute at 72nd minute in place of Luca Schuler.

On 23 July 2021, he was called up and made his debut with first team after coming on as a substitute at 73rd minute in place of Dominick Drexler in the league match against Hamburger SV at home, becoming the third ever Kosovan to make it to club's first team.

References

External links

2002 births
Living people
People from Ferizaj
Association football forwards
Kosovan footballers
Kosovan expatriate footballers
Kosovan expatriate sportspeople in Germany
German footballers
German people of Kosovan descent
German people of Albanian descent
Regionalliga players
FC Schalke 04 II players
2. Bundesliga players
FC Schalke 04 players
Berliner AK 07 players